The 2018 Letran Knights men's basketball team represented Colegio de San Juan de Letran in the 94th season of the National Collegiate Athletic Association in the Philippines. The men's basketball tournament for the school year 2018-19 began on July 7, 2018, and the host school for the season was the University of Perpetual Help System DALTA.

The Knights finished the double round-robin eliminations at third place with 13 wins against 5 losses. They went on to the Final Four for the first time in three years since winning their 17th championship in the 91st season, but got eliminated by the second-seed Lyceum Pirates, who had a twice-to-beat advantage over them.

Outgoing Knight and team captain Bong Quinto was named one of the Mythical Five members and Larry Muyang bagged the Rookie of the Year award.

Roster 

 Depth chart Depth chart

Roster changes 
The Knights lost its main star Rey Nambatac. Holdovers were Bong Quinto, JP Calvo, Jeo Ambohot, and Jerrick Balanza. Added to the roster were transferees Christian Fajarito, who played for St. Benilde Blazers in 2015 & 2016, big man Larry Muyang from De La Salle University, and former UE Red Warriors duo Edson Batiller and Fran Yu.

Coaching staff 
Coach Jeff Napa went on his third year as the head coach of the Knights. He was joined on the sidelines with Leo Pujante, Jay Agleron, Chico Manabat, and Letran Squires head coach RJ Guevarra.

This season also saw the San Miguel Corporation as the primary sponsor of the Letran sports program. Letran officials then appointed San Miguel Corporation sports director and Letran alumnus Alfrancis Chua as Special Assistant to the Rector for Sports Development.

Injuries 
Letran point guard JP Calvo sustained a high ankle sprain on his left foot during the Final Four match against Lyceum Pirates after he accidentally collided with Lyceum center Mike Nzeusseu when the two went for the loose ball.
On September 2018, Jerrick Balanza was diagnosed with a tumor in his temporal lobe of the brain. Balanza missed the rest of the season.

NCAA Season 94 games results 

Elimination games were played in a double round-robin format. All games were aired on  ABS-CBN Sports and Action & iWantTFC.

Source: Pong Ducanes, Imperium Technology

Awards

References 

2018–19 in Philippine college basketball
Letran Knights basketball team seasons